Dong Le'an (born January 28, 1982, in Hunan) is a female Chinese modern pentathlete who competed at the 2004 Summer Olympics.

She finished 24th in the women's competition.

External links
 Yahoo Sports profile

1982 births
Living people
Chinese female modern pentathletes
Modern pentathletes at the 2004 Summer Olympics
Olympic modern pentathletes of China
Sportspeople from Hunan
Asian Games medalists in modern pentathlon
Modern pentathletes at the 2002 Asian Games
Asian Games silver medalists for China
Medalists at the 2002 Asian Games
20th-century Chinese women
21st-century Chinese women